Maritime Square is a four-storey shopping centre located on Tsing Yi Island in Hong Kong. It was built and is owned by MTR Corporation (MTRC) in conjunction with the opening of Tsing Yi station.

History
The landlords claimed in December 2004 that daily pedestrian traffic at the mall is 170,000.

MTR expanded the shopping centre onto the site of the Tsing Yi lorry park. Some opposed the plan because it blocks the already crowded skyline. The MTR broke ground on the $2.4 billion project in 2015, and work was completed in 2017.

Design
Maritime Square is the first shopping mall in Hong Kong adopting ocean and navigation as the design theme.

Shops
Maritime Square houses a total of 140 shops. There are a wide variety of restaurants, bookstores, fashion stores, electrical appliances stores, supermarket, cinema and banks, etc. Numerous types of restaurants are available. For example, fast food restaurants like Café de Coral, traditional Chinese restaurants, cafés like Starbucks and restaurants providing Japanese and Thai food. There is also a Hong Kong Jockey Centre, which is the first off-course betting branch of the Hong Kong Jockey Club to be opened on the island.

Facilities
The following various customer services are available at the Customer Service Centres:

 Enquiries on mall promotional activities and transportation information
 Wheelchair lending (within the mall area only)
 Baby stroller lending (within the mall area only and limited supply)
 Emergency mobile phone battery charging
 Disposable raincoat
 Umbrella lending (limited supply)
 Lost child handling and lost & found service
 Octopus card add-value service

References

External links

 

Tsing Yi
MTR Corporation
Shopping malls established in 1998
Private housing estates in Hong Kong
Shopping centres in Hong Kong